Gaelyn Mendonca is an Indian actress, model and VJ for MTV India. She is best known for hosting WWE Now India and MTV Hustle.

Early life and education 
Gaelyn Mendonca was born on 5 November 1988 in Mumbai, India, and grew up in Orlem. She graduated from Carmel of St. Joseph School, and later studied economics and sociology at St. Xavier's College. For five consecutive years, she won street dance competitions at Malhar.

Career 
Mendonca began her career as a model while attending St Xavier's College. She has walked for numerous brands, including Lakme Fashion Week. After graduating from college, she began her broadcasting career as an anchor with Good Times on the program Cool Quotient.

In 2013, Mendonca won the MTV VJ Hunt alongside Sunanda Wong. In the same year, she made her Bollywood debut in Rohan Sippy's Nautanki Saala! As a VJ, she has hosted several programs and covered the 2011 Cricket World Cup. In 2016, She began hosting MTV Roadies and the reality rap program MTV Hustle.

In 2019, Mendonca was signed to World Wrestling Entertainment as a host for WWE Now India, which covers wrestling news for viewers in India.

Filmography

Film

Television

Personal life 
On 29 December 2017, Mendonca married her longtime boyfriend Sheehan Furtado. She is currently expecting her first child with her husband. Announcement was made on  Instagram account. 
https://www.instagram.com/p/CmCLIysPGfq/?igshid=MTg0ZDhmNDA=

References

External links 

Living people
Year of birth missing (living people)
Actresses from Mumbai
Female models from Mumbai
St. Xavier's College, Mumbai alumni
Indian film actresses
Indian television actresses
Actresses in Hindi cinema
Indian television personalities
Indian female models
Indian VJs (media personalities)
Indian game show hosts